Yangling railway station is a station on Longhai railway in Yangling District, Xianyang, Shaanxi.

History
The station was opened in 1936 as Wugong railway station.

In 1982, Yangling District was established and the name of the station was changed to Yanglingzhen railway station thereafter.

The station was renovated in 2006, and was renamed to the current name in 2014.

References

Railway stations in Shaanxi
Stations on the Longhai Railway
Railway stations in China opened in 1936